National Catholicism (Spanish: nacionalcatolicismo) was part of the ideological identity of Francoism, the political system through which the Spanish dictator Francisco Franco governed the Spanish State between 1939 and 1975. Its most visible manifestation was the hegemony that the Catholic Church had in all aspects of public and private life. As a symbol of the ideological divisions within Francoism, it can be contrasted to national syndicalism (Spanish: nacionalsindicalismo), an essential component of the ideology and political practice of the Falangists.

History 
In 1920s France, a similar model of National Catholicism was advanced by the Fédération Nationale Catholique formed by General Édouard Castelnau. Although it reached one million members in 1925, it was of short-lived significance, subsiding into obscurity by 1930.

In Spain, the Francoist State initiated a project in 1943 to reform the university. It was called the University Regulatory Law (U.R.L.), which remained active until 1970.

 

In the 1930s and 1940s, Ante Pavelić's Croatian Ustaše movement espoused a similar ideology, although it has been called other names, including "political Catholicism" and "Catholic Croatism". Other countries in central and eastern Europe where similar movements of Francoist inspiration combined Catholicism with nationalism include Austria, Poland, Lithuania and Slovakia.

See also 
 Action Française
 Catholic Church and Nazi Germany
 Catholic Church and Nazi Germany during World War II
 Christian fascism
 Christian nationalism
 Christian right
 Clerical fascism
 Dominion theology
 Movimiento Nacional
 Religious nationalism

References 

 BOTTI, Alfonso, Nazionalcattolicesimo e Spagna nuova (1881–1975), Milano, Franco Angeli, 1992  (Spanish trans. Cielo y dinero. El nacionalcatolicismo en España (1881–1975), Madrid, Alianza Editorial, 1992 )

Further reading 
 

Falangism
Francoist Spain
Political ideologies
Catholic nationalism
Catholicism and far-right politics
Catholic Church in Spain